Saktipur is a village in the Beldanga II CD block in the Berhampore subdivision of Murshidabad district in the state of West Bengal, India.  It is situated 35km away from district headquarter Baharampur.

Geography

Location

Area overview
The area shown in the map alongside, covering Berhampore and Kandi subdivisions, is spread across both the natural physiographic regions of the district, Rarh and Bagri. The headquarters of Murshidabad district, Berhampore, is in this area. The entire area is overwhelmingly rural with over 80% of the population living in the rural areas.

Note: The map alongside presents some of the notable locations in the subdivisions. All places marked in the map are linked in the larger full screen map.

Demographics
According to the 2011 Census of India, Saktipur had a total population of 13,123, of which 6,741 (51%) were males and 6,382 (49%) were females. Population in the age range 0-6 years was 1,661. The total number of literate persons in Saktipur was 7,709 (67.26% of the population over 6 years).

Civic administration

Police station
Saktipur police station has jurisdiction over a part of the Beldanga II CD block.

CD block HQ
The headquarters of Beldanga II CD block are located at Saktipur.

Healthcare
Saktipur Rural Hospital, with 30 beds, is a major government facility in Beldanga II CD block.

References

Villages in Murshidabad district